The Bioscop is a movie projector developed in 1895 by German inventors and filmmakers Max Skladanowsky and his brother Emil Skladanowsky (1866–1945).

History

The Bioscop used two loops of 54-mm films without a side perforation.

This caused poor control of the film-transport through the projector and might have contributed to the more successful development of the cinematograph by the French brothers Lumiere. 

The first public performance of the movie scenes using the Bioscop was organized in the restaurant Feldschlößchen in Berlin-Pankow, Berliner Straße 27. Three of the scenes became iconic for early cinematography: Boxing Kangaroo, The Wrestler and The Serpentine Dancer. They were all shot earlier in the garden of the same restaurant.

The ballroom of the Felschlößchen restaurant was later converted into the first permanent cinema in Germany and served the audience under the name Tivoli until it was closed  in 1994 and demolished to make space for a discount supermarket.

The Skladanovsky brothers later used the Bioscop to show movies to a larger audience in the Berlin Variete theater "Wintergarten". This can be considered the first movie program to a paid audience. In 1896, they traveled through the Netherlands and Scandinavia, presenting their invention to the international audience.

In the Netherlands and the Balkans the word "bioscop"/"bioscoop" means cinema. The term "Bioscope" had already been used by Jules Duboscq for his stereophotographic fantascope (produced around 1852/1853), but the device had not gained as much attention as the Skladanowsky film system.

References

External links
 
 

Film and video technology
Projectors
1895 in Germany